Fidel Barajas Juarez Jr. (born April 5, 2006) is a professional footballer who plays as a midfielder for USL Championship club Charleston Battery. Born in the United States, he has represented both the United States and Mexico at youth level.

Club career
Born in Sacramento, California, Barajas had been part of the youth academies at both Sacramento Republic and San Jose Earthquakes before signing a professional contract with USL Championship club Charleston Battery on September 3, 2022.

On October 1, Barajas made his professional debut for the Battery in their 6–3 defeat at Hartford Athletic, coming on as a 71st-minute substitute and recording one assist. He made his first start on October 8 against Indy Eleven, registering another assist in the 4-1 loss. Barajas made three total appearances in 2022.

International career
Barajas has represented both the United States and Mexico youth national teams.

Barajas competed in a UEFA Development Tournament in May 2022 with the USYNT, playing against the youth squads of Portugal, Italy and Belgium. He tallied an assist in the match against Belgium, a 0-3 victory, and also played against the youth teams of Argentina and Uruguay.

For Mexico, Barajas played for the Mexico U-17's at the International Dream Cup in Japan in June 2022. He featured in matches against Japan, South Korea, and Uruguay, scoring one goal against South Korea and contributing two assists against Uruguay. Barajas rejoined Mexico in October 2022 for the UNCAF FIFA Forward U-16 Tournament in Honduras. Fidel appeared in all four matches, scoring one goal and contributing four assists, as Mexico ended as runners-up in the tournament final.

Career statistics

Honours
Mexico U17
CONCACAF U-17 Championship: 2023

References

External links
 Profile at Charleston Battery

2006 births
Living people
Sportspeople from Sacramento, California
American soccer players
Association football forwards
Charleston Battery players
USL Championship players
Soccer players from California
Mexican footballers
United States men's youth international soccer players
Mexico youth international footballers